Nark was king of the southern Laotian Kingdom of Champasak from 1841 to 1851.

Kings of Champasak
19th-century Laotian people
Year of birth missing
Year of death missing